India competed at the 1988 Winter Olympics in Calgary, Alberta, Canada.  It was the first time that the nation had sent athletes to the Winter Games in 20 years.

Competitors
The following is the list of number of competitors in the Games.

Women's Slalom skier Shailaja Kumar became the first woman to compete for India in the Winter Olympic Games. Gul Dev and Kishor Rahtna Rai both represented India in Men's Slalom.

Alpine skiing

Men

Women

References 

 Official Olympic Reports
 Olympics-Reference.com

Nations at the 1988 Winter Olympics
1988